The 6th World Sports Acrobatics Championships were held in London, Great Britain, in 1982.

Men's Tumbling

Overall

First Exercise

Second Exercise

Men's Group

Overall

First Exercise

Second Exercise

Men's Pair

Overall

First Exercise

Second Exercise

Mixed Pair

Overall

First Exercise

Second Exercise

Women's Group

Overall

First Exercise

Second Exercise

Women's Pair

Overall

First Exercise

Second Exercise

Women's Tumbling

Overall

First Exercise

Second Exercise

References

Acrobatic Gymnastics Championships
Acrobatic Gymnastics World Championships
International gymnastics competitions hosted by the United Kingdom
1982 in English sport